Zorah on the Terrace (1912), oil on canvas, is a painting by Henri Matisse in the collection of the Pushkin Museum of Fine Arts, Moscow, Russia.

See also
 Henri Matisse and goldfish

1912 paintings
Paintings by Henri Matisse
Paintings in Russia
Fish in art